Anton Dudchenko (born 17 December 1996) is a Ukrainian biathlete. He has competed in the Biathlon World Cup since 2019.

Biathlon results
All results are sourced from the International Biathlon Union.

World Championships
0 medals

*During Olympic seasons competitions are only held for those events not included in the Olympic program.
**The single mixed relay was added as an event in 2019.

References

External links

1996 births
Living people
Ukrainian male biathletes
Biathletes at the 2022 Winter Olympics
Olympic biathletes of Ukraine
Sportspeople from Sumy Oblast